Xenopus itombwensis is a species of frogs in the family Pipidae endemic to the Itombwe Massif of the South Kivu Province of the Democratic Republic of the Congo.

References 

itombwensis
Amphibians described in 2008
Frogs of Africa
Endemic fauna of the Democratic Republic of the Congo